In probability theory and statistics, an inverse distribution is the distribution of the reciprocal of a random variable. Inverse distributions arise in particular in the Bayesian context of prior distributions and posterior distributions for scale parameters. In the algebra of random variables, inverse distributions are special cases of the class of ratio distributions, in which the numerator random variable has a degenerate distribution.

Relation to original distribution

In general, given the probability distribution of a random variable X with strictly positive support,  it is possible to find the distribution of the reciprocal, Y = 1 /  X. If the distribution of X is continuous with density function f(x) and cumulative distribution function F(x), then the cumulative distribution function, G(y), of the reciprocal is found by noting that

Then the density function of Y is found as the derivative of the cumulative distribution function:

Examples

Reciprocal distribution
The reciprocal distribution has a density function of the form.

where  means "is proportional to".
It follows that the inverse distribution in this case is of the form

which is again a reciprocal distribution.

Inverse uniform distribution

If the original random variable X is uniformly distributed on the interval (a,b), where a>0, then the reciprocal variable Y = 1 / X has the reciprocal distribution which takes values in the range (b−1 ,a−1), and the probability density function in this range is

 

and is zero elsewhere.

The cumulative distribution function of the reciprocal, within the same range,  is

 

For example, if X is uniformly distributed on the interval (0,1), then Y = 1 / X has density   and cumulative distribution function  when

Inverse t distribution

Let X be a t distributed random variate with k degrees of freedom. Then its density function is

 

The density of Y = 1 / X is

 

With k = 1, the distributions of X and 1 / X are identical (X is then Cauchy distributed (0,1)). If k > 1 then the distribution of 1 / X is bimodal.

Reciprocal normal distribution

If variable X follows a normal distribution ,
then the inverse or reciprocal Y=1/X follows a reciprocal normal distribution:

 

If variable X follows a standard normal distribution ,
then Y=1/X follows a reciprocal standard normal distribution, 
heavy-tailed and bimodal,

and the first and higher-order moments do not exist.
For such inverse distributions and for ratio distributions, there can still be defined probabilities for intervals, which can be computed either by Monte Carlo simulation or, in some cases, by using the Geary–Hinkley transformation.

However, in the more general case of a shifted reciprocal function , for  following a general normal distribution, then mean and variance statistics do exist in a principal value sense, if the difference between the pole  and the mean  is real-valued.  The mean of this transformed random variable (reciprocal shifted normal distribution) is then indeed the scaled Dawson's function:  
.

In contrast, if the shift  is purely complex, the mean exists and is a scaled Faddeeva function, whose exact expression depends on the sign of the imaginary part, .
In both cases, the variance is a simple function of the mean. Note that these means and variances are exact, as they do not recur to linearisation of the ratio.
The case of the inverse of a complex normal variable , shifted or not, exhibits different characteristics.

Inverse exponential distribution 
Note that the expected value of this random variable does not exist. The reciprocal exponential distribution finds use in the analysis of fading wireless communication systems.

Inverse Cauchy distribution

If X is a Cauchy distributed (μ, σ) random variable, then 1 / X is a Cauchy ( μ / C, σ / C ) random variable where C = μ2 + σ2.

Inverse F distribution

If X is an F(ν1, ν2 ) distributed random variable then 1 / X is an F(ν2, ν1 ) random variable.

Reciprocal of binomial distribution

No closed form for this distribution is known. An asymptotic approximation for the mean is known.

where E[] is the expectation operator, X is a random variable, O() and o() are the big and little o order functions, n is the sample size, p is the probability of success and a is a variable that may be positive or negative, integer or fractional.

Reciprocal of triangular distribution

For a triangular distribution with lower limit a, upper limit b and mode c, where a < b and a ≤ c ≤ b, the mean of the reciprocal is given by

and the variance by

.

Both moments of the reciprocal are only defined when the triangle does not cross zero, i.e. when a, b, and c are either all positive or all negative.

Other inverse distributions

Other inverse distributions include
inverse-chi-squared distribution
inverse-gamma distribution
inverse-Wishart distribution
inverse matrix gamma distribution

Applications

Inverse distributions are widely used as prior distributions in Bayesian inference for scale parameters.

See also

Harmonic mean
Ratio distribution
Self-reciprocal distributions

References

Algebra of random variables
Types of probability distributions